Didarul Alam (born 1 September 1988) is a former Bangladeshi footballer who last played as a midfielder for Sheikh Jamal Dhanmondi Club in the Bangladesh Premier League and for the Bangladesh national football team.

Career statistics

International caps

Honours

Club

Dhaka Abahani
Bangladesh Premier League: 2017–18
Federation Cup: 2017

References

Living people
1996 births
Bangladeshi footballers
Bangladesh international footballers
Association football midfielders
Abahani Limited (Dhaka) players
Sheikh Jamal Dhanmondi Club players
Rahmatganj MFS players
People from Cox's Bazar District
Bangladesh Football Premier League players